English Pastoral may refer to:
English Pastoral (book), a 2020 nonfiction book by James Rebanks
English Pastoral School, a group of 20th-century classical composers